Ynolates are chemical compounds with a negatively charged oxygen attached to an alkyne functionality. They were first synthesized in 1975 by Schöllkopf and Hoppe via the n-butyllithium fragmentation of 3,4-diphenylisoxazole.

Synthetically, they behave as ketene precursors or synthons.

See also
Enolate

References

Functional groups